The western broad-nosed bat (Platyrrhinus nitelinea) is a species of bat in the family Phyllostomidae. It is found in Colombia and Ecuador.

References

Platyrrhinus
Mammals described in 2005
Bats of South America
Mammals of Colombia
Mammals of Ecuador